M5 is the newest of the five lines of the Bucharest Metro, opened on 15 September 2020. In the first phase, it runs from Eroilor to Râul Doamnei, and to Valea Ialomiței, in the Drumul Taberei neighbourhood.

History
In 2011, construction started on the first section of the M5. The expected construction cost was €708.6 million.

After that, the line will be extended to Iancului, and from there under Iancului Road (Șoseaua Iancului) until it reaches the Pantelimon station of M1.

Rolling stock
Until 2023, when new Alstom Metropolitan French trains for this line are meant to arrive, 8 Canadian Bombardier Movia 346 train sets are used, redistributed from M3.

Stations

Sources: metrorex.ro, adevarul.ro, wall-street.ro

References

External links
 Bucharest Metro Line 5 site
 Bucharest Metro Line 5 old site

Bucharest Metro Lines
Proposed rail infrastructure in Romania
Railway lines opened in 2020